Keleminovec is a settlement (naselje) in the Sveti Ivan Zelina administrative territory of Zagreb County, Croatia. In 2011, it had a population of 116.

References

Populated places in Zagreb County